Brendan Joel Zibusiso Galloway (born 17 March 1996) is a Zimbabwean professional footballer who plays as a defender for League One club Plymouth Argyle. A former youth international for England, Galloway represents the Zimbabwe national team.

Club career

Milton Keynes Dons
Brendan Galloway was born in Harare, Zimbabwe on 17 March 1996, and moved to England with his family when he was six years old. He started playing for Milton Keynes Dons when he joined the club's under-11 side.

He became the youngest first-team player in Milton Keynes Dons' history at 15 years of age after making his debut as a 79th-minute substitute in a 6–0 victory at home to Nantwich Town in the FA Cup first round on 12 November 2011. He made his league début after starting for MK Dons in a 2–1 victory at Rochdale on 28 April 2012. He scored his first senior goal for MK Dons in their 4–1 win over Halifax Town on 9 November 2013.

Everton
In August 2014 Everton signed Galloway for an undisclosed fee on a five-year contract. He spent the majority of the season playing for the under-21 side until the very latter stage of the league campaign. Galloway was given a chance and made his début for the senior side in Everton's 2–1 away win against West Ham United on 16 May 2015. He played at left back in the game, despite ordinarily being a centre-back. On the last day of the 2014–15 season, Galloway turned out for his senior home début against Tottenham Hotspur.

On the opening day of the 2015–16 season, as regular left back Leighton Baines suffered an ankle injury in training and Luke Garbutt had joined Fulham on loan, Galloway started Everton's match against Watford.

Galloway agreed a new contract with Everton on 10 December 2015 and was at that time contracted to the club until at least June 2020.

Loan to West Bromwich Albion
On 22 August 2016, Galloway joined West Bromwich Albion on a season-long loan. Galloway made his first league start for West Brom on 28 August 2016 against Middlesbrough. On 10 April 2017, Galloway was recalled by Everton. It was reported that Galloway had been given permission to return to Everton early even he remained registered with West Bromwich Albion who paid £1m to take him on loan for the campaign.

Luton Town
On 3 July 2019, Galloway joined Luton Town for a free transfer from Everton. On 28 May 2021, Luton Town announced the departures of Galloway and several other players following the conclusion of their contracts

Plymouth Argyle
On 21 July 2021, after playing in several trial games in pre-season during the summer of 2021, Galloway joined Plymouth Argyle on a short-term contract until January 2022. On 14 August, Galloway made his league debut playing the full 90 minutes of a 1–0 win over Gillingham.

International career
Galloway is eligible to play for Zimbabwe or England. He was named in the England U-17 squad for the Nordic Under-17 Football Championship in 2012 by Kenny Swain. His first match for England was against the Faroe Islands in August 2012.
He represented England in the 2014 UEFA Under-19 Championship qualifying campaign.

In 2016, Zimbabwe approached Galloway to play for them in the 2017 African Cup of Nations but Galloway chose to remain part of the England U21 set up. He formally represented Zimbabwe in a 1–0 2022 FIFA World Cup qualification loss to Ghana on 12 October 2021. During that match he played as a center back partnering Alec Mudimu, and Ghana struggled to break that defence.

Career statistics

Honours
Everton U23s

 Premier League Cup: 2018–19

Individual
Football League Apprentice of the Year: 2013–14 League One

References

External links
Profile at the Luton Town F.C. website
Profile at the Football Association website

1996 births
Living people
Zimbabwean emigrants to the United Kingdom
English people of Zimbabwean descent
Sportspeople from Harare
Zimbabwean footballers
Zimbabwe international footballers
English footballers
Association football defenders
Association football midfielders
England youth international footballers
England under-21 international footballers
English Football League players
Premier League players
Milton Keynes Dons F.C. players
Everton F.C. players
West Bromwich Albion F.C. players
Sunderland A.F.C. players
Luton Town F.C. players
Plymouth Argyle F.C. players